Survivor: Fans vs. Survivors (Hisardut Ohadim Neged Soredim), also known as Survivor: All-Stars (Hisardut Olstars), is the fourth season of the Israeli reality TV show Survivor, which was filmed in the Philippines. The season featured a tribe of returning players competing against a tribe of new players, a format previously seen in Survivor: Micronesia — Fans vs. Favorites. It aired from February 28, 2010, to April 4, 2010, when Natan Bashevkin won. Dan Mano was named as the audience's favorite by winning a public vote.

This season brought back the Island of the Dead from the first season, where voted-out players competed against each other to return to the game. The Island of the Dead ended at the merge, at which point Exile Island from the second season, where two players were banished for 24 hours and competed against each other for rewards, was introduced. With only 16 competitors, 32 days and 24 episodes, it was the shortest season of Survivor.



Contestants

Season summary

Summary

Episodes 1–2 

Reward Challenge: The tribes ran into a river filled with supplies for their camps. Once teams collected the necessary supplies, they crossed the finish line with all of their chosen supplies. The winning tribe got a boat ride to carry them and all of their belongings to their new beach home.
Immunity Challenge: Tribes climbed over four slanted walls, then tied ropes to a large crate, which other members pulled up a slide. Once the box was on top of the slide, another member opened the crate and lit the torch inside it.
Individual Immunity Challenge: Tribes lit a fire, which would burn through a rope. The first survivor to have their rope burnt won immunity.

Summary 
The tribes moved immediately to their first challenge. The tribes played violently, and both tribes tried to stop the other's weakest member from moving. Mayon was declared the winner. As a punishment, the Kalinga tribe they unanimously voted Ariela out, who received a private helicopter ride to the beach and a clue to look for the hidden immunity idol. Max became dehydrated and was evacuated during the first night, and was therefore unable participate in the immunity challenge. Ariela could not get to the immunity idol, so she asked Guy to join in an alliance with her and get it for her. At the immunity challenge, the Mayon tribe sat out Idan, thinking that he was their weakest male. The Mayon tribe won the challenge and won flint in addition to being safe from the vote. Itay won the immunity challenge after a close finish. The Kalinga tribe went to Tribal Council and voted out Ariela by a 6-2 vote. Dar got two votes.

Episode 3–4

Reward Challenge: Members from each tribe took balls to shoot into a basket. The first tribe to get three baskets won and got a fishing kit, along with a day with a local who taught them tricks that would help them with life in the forest.
Immunity Challenge: A challenge recently used in Heroes vs. Villains, one tribe member was inside a large wooden ball and three members would be blindfolded. The person in the ball directed the three blindfolded tribe mates through a path to collect a metal ball. The metal ball was placed on a tilting maze. The person in the ball directed four more blindfolded people to get the ball into the hole in the tilting maze.
Individual Immunity Challenge: The survivors stood on a wooden pole in the ocean while two members of the other tribe tried to hit them down with sand bags. The last person on the wooden pole would win immunity.

Summary 
The Kalinga tribe questioned Guy about his immunity idol after Ariela revealed it at the last Tribal Council. He lied and said that he did not have it. Everyone but Sharon believed him. Osher was evacuated due to back pains and was not there for the reward challenge, but returned afterwards. The All-Star tribe won the reward challenge 3-0. The Mayon tribe got tree mail, which stated that they had to choose two people to go to a challenge. After much arguing, Mirit and Bashevkin went. The two Mayon tribe members after the challenge, which Lidar won, returned to their beach by boat and decided to trick everyone. The Kalinga tribe went to Tribal Council. Guy used his immunity idol and Osher was voted out.

Episodes 5–6

Reward Challenge: Each tribe brought six huge cubes and solve a puzzle that includes the tribe's name. Kalinga won a massage done by the opposite tribe, and bottles of oils and lotions.
Individual Immunity Challenge: This challenge was used in Survivor: Samoa, Mayon (Bashevkin), and Survivor: Micronesia, Kalinga (Dar).
Tribal Council: Both tribes eliminated a tribemate. Kalinga tribe voted out Itay because of his bossiness around camp. The Mayon tribe voted Dan out 5-3.

Episodes 7–8

Reward Challenge: The two tribes balanced on rolling logs. The first person to lose balance and fall does not get a point. Mayon tribe won 8-4 and received a bath, with lotions presented by Ahava.
Immunity challenge: Each tribe split into pairs and one person had to decide how many bags to put on the opposite tribe's rope. Lidar fainted in the middle of the challenge. Dar lost focus and dropped the bags. Due to that, the Kalinga tribe lost their fourth immunity challenge in a row. Mayon tribe sent one member to go to the Kalinga tribe to vote at Tribal Council.

At Tribal Council, Dar was eliminated.
.

Episodes 9–10

Episodes 11–12

Episodes 13–14

Episode 16–17
 Survivor Auction: There was no Reward Challenge, and a Survivor Auction was held instead.

Voting history

External links
 Official Survivor 10 website 
 אגוז צרפתי

Fans vs. Favorites
Channel 10 (Israeli TV channel) original programming
2010 Israeli television seasons
Television shows filmed in the Philippines